Geothallus is a monotypic genus of liverwort in the family Sphaerocarpaceae family. It includes only the single species Geothallus tuberosus. Its common name is Campbell's liverwort. It is endemic to California, where it is known only from San Diego and Riverside Counties.

This liverwort grows in moist coastal scrub habitat and vernal pools. At least one population occurs on the grounds of Marine Corps Base Camp Pendleton, and it has also been noted on the Santa Rosa Plateau.

References

Sphaerocarpales
Liverwort genera
Endemic flora of California
Bryophyta of North America
Natural history of the California chaparral and woodlands
Natural history of Riverside County, California
Natural history of San Diego County, California
Natural history of the Peninsular Ranges
Monotypic bryophyte genera
Critically endangered flora of California
Taxonomy articles created by Polbot